William Albert Haynes III (born July 10, 1953) is an American retired professional wrestler, better known by the ring name Billy Jack Haynes.

Professional wrestling career

Early career (1982–1984) 
Haynes started wrestling in 1982 at the age of 28. He trained in Stu Hart's Dungeon pro wrestling school and briefly wrestled in Hart's Stampede Wrestling under his given name, forming a tag team with Bruce Hart. He started wrestling as "Billy Jack" in the Pacific Northwest territory but had to change his name when Tom Laughlin (who starred in the movie Billy Jack) threatened to sue him. He added his real last name to the gimmick and continued to work as a babyface. It is rumored that Haynes served time for manslaughter before becoming a pro wrestler.

Championship Wrestling from Florida; Pacific Northwest Wrestling (1984–1986) 
He feuded heavily with Rip Oliver until 1984, when he had a run in Championship Wrestling from Florida where he feuded with Kendo Nagasaki for the NWA Florida Heavyweight Championship winning the title from him. They then had a brief run in World Class Championship Wrestling in 1985, managed by Sunshine. Due to internal conflict between Fritz Von Erich and Billy, he was written out of the organization, jobbing to Rip Oliver in a storyline where Rip bloodies and injured Billy.  He rarely stayed put in any federation that he went to. During that time he faced off against the debuting Shawn Michaels. He started splitting his time between Portland Wrestling and CWF and wrestled with partner Wahoo McDaniel and won the NWA Florida United States Tag Team Championship and in Jim Crockett Promotions where they feuded with Ole and Arn Anderson. He had just begun a feud with The Barbarian over who was the strongest man in the territory when he abruptly left the company after a confrontation with Jim Crockett in his office which became physical.

World Wrestling Federation (1986–1988) 
In June 1986, Haynes went to the World Wrestling Federation and feuded with Randy Savage over the Intercontinental Championship and then with Hercules Hernandez over who was stronger, more muscular, and who had a better version of the full nelson (their mutual finishing maneuver). Their feud in the WWF peaked with what was dubbed "The Battle of the Full Nelsons" at WrestleMania III, where the two men battled to a double count-out. After the bell, Hercules' manager Bobby Heenan kneed Haynes in the back while he had Hercules in a full nelson out on the floor. Haynes chased Heenan into the ring where Hercules blindsided him with his trademark chain, hitting Haynes multiple times and (Kayfabe) cutting his forehead (in reality, Haynes had bladed himself with a small razor hidden in the tapes around his wrists after the first hit. He was actually seen on camera taking the razor out of his wrist tapes while chasing Heenan around the ring).

In the months to follow, the two had a series of "chain matches," where they were attached at the wrist by a foot long chain which could also be used as a weapon during the match. Haynes later teamed with fellow Oregon native Ken Patera who had returned to the WWF. Haynes saved Patera from a beating at the hands of Hercules and Harley Race after Patera's return match. The pair would later feud with Demolition after a television match where Demolition left Haynes, Patera, and Brady Boone (who played Haynes' cousin) beaten and lying in the ring. Haynes' departure from the WWF in January 1988 has been a subject of controversy considering dramatic changes in the story as Haynes repeated it. In one version, he says he quit the WWF after refusing to do a job in his hometown of Portland, Oregon. Another account of the same incident reported that he actually wrestled the match with the finish reworked and then was fired afterwards.

Late career (1988–1996) 
Haynes returned to Oregon in 1988 and wrestled in their independents, including forming his own promotion, Oregon Wrestling Federation. In the summer of 1989, he returned to Portland and immediately feuded with The Grappler. By the end of the year, he would form an alliance with former rival Rip Oliver and his son Larry. On April 14, 1990, he turned on the Olivers during a match with The Grappler, The Equalizer, and Brian Adams, turning heel for the first time in his career. As a heel, he feuded with the Olivers, Scott Norton, and Scotty the Body. In October 1990, he did several shows for Herb Abrams' Universal Wrestling Federation, where they built up another strongman feud between Haynes and Ken Patera. In May 1991, Haynes returned to the major promotions when he appeared under a mask in World Championship Wrestling as Black Blood in Kevin Sullivan's stable. Soon after The Great American Bash, he was fired in July 1991, due to a pay dispute. At the time he was fired, he suffered a severe knee injury. Instead of recuperating, he went back to Portland, where he feuded with top babyface Steve Doll and Demolition Crush. After PNW shut down in 1992, Haynes took time off to recover from his knee injury he suffered in WCW, which took eighteen months to fully recover from. His first matches back was in June 1994, where he wrestled shows that were co-promoted by PNW's successor Championship Wrestling USA and Mexico's Asistencia Asesoría y Administración in Vancouver, Washington. He showed up next in the United States Wrestling Association in 1995 and retired in early 1996.

Personal life
On March 16, 2013, Haynes was hospitalized because he was suffering from an aortic aneurysm, and liver and kidney issues.

In October 2014, the Portland Tribune reported that Haynes filed a lawsuit in federal court against WWE, alleging "egregious mistreatment of its wrestlers for its own benefit, as well as its concealment and denial of medical research and evidence concerning traumatic brain injuries suffered by WWE wrestlers." This litigation was taken after research into chronic traumatic encephalopathy (CTE), which was attributed to causing the deaths of Chris Benoit in 2007 and Andrew Martin in 2009.  Haynes also sought for the court to grant class action status for hundreds of former wrestlers and to force WWE to establish a medical trust fund to pay for wrestlers who suffer from injuries that took place in a WWE ring. Former WWE stars Vito Lograsso and Adam Mercer filed a class action lawsuit against WWE in January 2015 while being represented by the same lawyer as Haynes, Konstantine Kyros.  In March 2016, the suit was dismissed by Judge Vanessa Lynne Bryant. At the time of dismissal, dozens of former WWE wrestlers had joined a class action lawsuit under Kyros's counsel.

Championships and accomplishments 
Championship Wrestling from Florida
 NWA Florida Heavyweight Championship (1 time)
 NWA United States Tag Team Championship (Florida version) (1 time) - with Wahoo McDaniel
Oregon Wrestling Federation
OWF Heavyweight Championship (2 times)
Pacific Northwest Wrestling
 NWA Pacific Northwest Heavyweight Championship (5 times)
 NWA Pacific Northwest Tag Team Championship (3 times) - with Stan Stasiak (2 times) and Ricky Vaughn (1 time)
Pro Wrestling Illustrated
PWI Most Improved Wrestler of the Year (1984)
PWI ranked him #143 of the top 500 singles wrestlers of the "PWI Years" in 2003
United States Wrestling Association
 USWA Southern Heavyweight Championship (2 times)
World Class Championship Wrestling
WCCW Television Championship (1 time)

References

External links 
 

1953 births
American male professional wrestlers
Living people
Professional wrestlers from Oregon
Professional wrestling promoters
Stampede Wrestling alumni
20th-century professional wrestlers
NWA Florida Heavyweight Champions
NWA United States Tag Team Champions (Florida version)